Suliman Safi (born 17 March 2003) is an Afghan cricketer. He made his first-class debut for Kabul Province in the 2018–19 Mirwais Nika Provincial 3-Day tournament on 15 February 2019. He made his List A debut for Band-e-Amir Region in the 2019 Ghazi Amanullah Khan Regional One Day Tournament on 17 September 2019. In December 2021, he was named as the captain of Afghanistan's team for the 2022 ICC Under-19 Cricket World Cup in the West Indies.
Lead Afghanistan in U19 Asia cup also 
And made his t20 debut for Aflac Bost defenders in 2022 in Afghanistan t20 cricket league

References

External links
 

2003 births
Living people
Afghan cricketers
Place of birth missing (living people)